Thomas Wall (19 August 1914 – 15 April 2005) was an Irish hurler who played as a midfielder for the Tipperary senior team.

Born in Carrick-on-Suir, County Tipperary, Wall first arrived on the inter-county scene when he first linked up with the Tipperary senior team before later joining the junior Gaelic football team. He made his senior debut during the 1936 championship. Wall enjoyed a sporadic career with Tipperary and won one All-Ireland medal and one Munster medal.

At club level Wall was a one-time championship medalist with Carrick Swans.

His brother, Willie, also won an All-Ireland medal with Tipperary.

Honours

Team

Carrick Swans
Tipperary Senior Hurling Championship (1): 1947

Tipperary
All-Ireland Senior Hurling Championship (1): 1945
Munster Senior Hurling Championship (1): 1945

References

1914 births
2005 deaths
Carrick Swans hurlers
Carrick Swans Gaelic footballers
Tipperary inter-county hurlers
All-Ireland Senior Hurling Championship winners